Motion pictures have been a part of the culture of Canada since the industry began.

History
Around 1910, the East Coast filmmakers began to take advantage of the mild California winter climates, and after Nestor Studios, run by Canadian Al Christie, built the first permanent movie studio in Hollywood, a number of the movie companies expanded or relocated to the new Hollywood. At the same time, because there was no sound in movies, several French filmmakers had their motion pictures distributed in the United States.

List of Canadian film pioneers in Hollywood
Among those Canadians who took part in the early years of Hollywood were:
 Allakariallak (1890s–1924?), Inuit actor and subject of "Nanook of the North"
 Charles Arling (1880–1922), actor
 Earl W. Bascom (1906-1995), actor, artist, worked with Roy Rogers, worked on Louis B. Mayer's ranch in Perris, California
 William Bertram (1880–1933), actor, director
 Ben Blue (1901–1975), actor, comedian
 Raymond Burr (1917–1993), actor; Perry Mason, Ironside
 Jack Carson (1910–1963), actor
 Peggy Cartwright (1912-2001), actress in Our Gang comedy series and with Harold Lloyd
 Al Christie (1881–1951), co-founder of Christie Film Company, director/producer/screenwriter
 Charles Christie (1880–1955), co-founder of Christie Film Company; builder of Hollywood's first luxury hotel
 Berton Churchill (1876–1940), actor
 Yvonne De Carlo (1922–2007), actor
 Joe De Grasse (1873–1940), director
 Sam De Grasse (1875–1953), actor
 Fifi D'Orsay (1904–1983), actress
 Marie Dressler (1869–1934), Academy Award for Best Actress
 Douglass Dumbrille (1889–1974), moving and television actor
 Deanna Durbin (1921–2013), actress, singer
 Allan Dwan (1885–1981), director, producer, screenwriter
 Edward Earle (1882–1972), actor
 Rockliffe Fellowes (1883–1950), actor
 Glenn Ford (1916–2006), actor
 John Harvey Gahan (1888–1958), as Oscar Gahan, actor, musician, composer; Canada's child prodigy violinist, aka Arvé
 Huntley Gordon (1887–1956), actor
 Lorne Greene (1915–1987), actor; played Ben Cartwight, Commander Adama
 June Havoc (1912-2010), actress
 Harry Hayden (1882–1955), actor
 Del Henderson (1883–1956), actor, director, writer
 Walter Huston (1884–1950), Academy Award winning actor
 May Irwin (1862–1938), actor, first screen kiss in 1896
 Victor Jory (1902–1982), actor
 Ruby Keeler (1909–1993), dancer, actress
 Barbara Kent (1907–2011), actress
 Florence La Badie (1888–1917), actress
 Florence Lawrence (1886–1938), "America's first movie star"
 Rosina Lawrence (1912-1997), actress
 Beatrice Lillie (1894–1989), actress
 Gene Lockhart (1891–1957), actor
 Del Lord (1894–1970), comedy director
 Wilfred Lucas (1871–1940), director, screenwriter, actor
 Henry MacRae (1876–1944), director, producer, screenwriter, actor
 David Manners (1900–1998), actor
 Raymond Massey (1896–1983), actor
 Louis B. Mayer (1885–1957), co–founder of Metro Goldwyn Mayer Motion Picture Studios
 Bob Nolan (1908–1980), singer/actor in western musicals as leader of "The Sons of the Pioneers"
 Sidney Olcott (1872–1949), director
 Jack Pickford (1896–1933), actor, Hollywood's first "Bad Boy"
 Lottie Pickford (1893–1936), actress
 Mary Pickford (1892–1979), "America's Sweetheart," Academy Award for Best Actress, co–founder of United Artists
 Walter Pidgeon (1897–1984), actor
 Marie Prevost (1896–1937), actress
 John Qualen (1899-1987), actor
 William Quinn (1884–1965), actor
 Mack Sennett (1880–1960), director, known as the "King of Comedy"
 Athole Shearer (1900–1985), actress, wife of director Howard Hawks
 Douglas Shearer (1899–1971), sound director/designer, winner of seven Academy Awards
 Norma Shearer (1902–1983), Academy Award for Best Actress
 Nell Shipman (1892–1970), actress, writer, producer
 Jay Silverheels (1912–1980), actor known for his portrayal of Tonto, sidekick to the Lone Ranger
 Alexis Smith (1921–1993), actor
 Ned Sparks (1883–1957), actor
 Richard Travers  (1885–1935), actor
 Jack L. Warner (1892–1978), co-founder of Warner Brothers
 Marjorie White (1904–1935), actress
 Joseph Wiseman (1918–2009), actor

Canadian scene in Hollywood
In his book Stardust and Shadows: Canadians in Early Hollywood, Charles Foster recounted his experiences meeting some of these Canadians while on leave from the Royal Air Force during World War II. Foster visited Hollywood where he was introduced to Canadian and silent movie director Sidney Olcott. Through Olcott he learned of Hollywood's Canadian community. Although total strangers, young Foster was welcomed with open arms. This social gathering of "Canucks" also included Walter Pidgeon, Deanna Durbin, Fifi D'Orsay, and others who worked in the movie business.

Several of these Canadian pioneers achieved enormous wealth and worldwide fame, such as Louis B. Mayer and Mary Pickford who were, in their day, two of the most powerful personalities in Hollywood. From the late 1920s to the mid-1930s, Canadian female actresses were amongst the greatest box office draws. The Academy Award for Best Actress was won by Canadian women three years in a row:
 1929 - Mary Pickford in Coquette
 1930 - Norma Shearer in The Divorcee
 1931 - Marie Dressler in Min and Bill

Foster recounts the feelings and deep loyalty of Louis B. Mayer. Although he had become a naturalized American citizen, Mayer was known to hire Canadian compatriots on the spot, as Saint John, New Brunswick native Walter Pidgeon later recalled:

Several Canadian expatriates also saw their careers decline and died before the age of 55. Florence Lawrence, the "first real movie star", the Biograph Girl in Hollywood history, who appeared in more than 270 movies, committed suicide at the age of 52. She is buried in unmarked grave in the Hollywood Cemetery. Marie Prevost, who was a leading lady during the mid-1920s, suffered from depression after the death of her mother in 1926. In 1937, she died of acute alcoholism and malnutrition at the age of 38. Florence La Badie died of injuries she sustained in a car accident in August 1917 at the age of 29. Jack Pickford, Mary Pickford's younger brother, died at age 36 from what was then known as multiple neuritis, while his sister Lottie died of a heart attack at age 43.

References

Further reading
 Charles Foster, Stardust and Shadows: Canadians in Early Hollywood, 2000,  Dundurn Press 

History of Hollywood, Los Angeles
+
Cultural history of Canada
 Hollywood